Trito may refer to:

 Trito (Proto-Indo-European mythology), a warrior in Proto-Indo-European mythology
 Tritogeneia or Trito, an epithet of Athena in Greek mythology
 Lake Tritonis or Trito, a lake in Greek mythology

See also 

 Triton (disambiguation)